The Archdiocese of Portland in Oregon (Archidioecesis Portlandensis in Oregonia) is an archdiocese of the Catholic Church in the Pacific Northwest region of the United States. It encompasses the western part of the state of Oregon, from the summit of the Cascades to the Pacific Ocean. The Archbishop of Portland serves as the Ordinary of the archdiocese and Metropolitan of the Ecclesiastical Province of Portland whose suffragan dioceses cover the entire three states of Oregon, Idaho, and Montana. The dioceses of the province include Baker (eastern Oregon), Boise (Idaho), Helena (western Montana), and Great Falls-Billings (eastern Montana).

As published in the 2013 "Oregon Catholic Directory," this archdiocese serves 412,725 Catholics (out of more than 3.3 million people). There are 150 diocesan priests, 144 religious priests, 79 permanent deacons, 388 women religious, and 78 religious brothers. The archdiocese has 124 parishes, 22 missions, 1 seminary, 40 elementary schools, 10 secondary schools, and 2 Catholic colleges.

History 
There were thirteen Canadians in John Jacob Astor's expedition of 1810. Most were Catholic, and many, like Étienne Lucier, settled in the Willamette Valley. By 1829, Lucier had established a permanent land claim next to the Willamette Fur Post near Champoeg on the French Prairie. On March 22, 1836, he and 15 other French Canadian settlers on the petitioned sent to Norbert Provencher, the titular Bishop of Juliopolis, to request a priest for the settlement. Missionary priests, Rev. François Norbert Blanchet and Rev. Modeste Demers arrived at Fort Vancouver on November 24, 1838.

On December 1, 1843, the Vatican established the Vicariate Apostolic of the Oregon Territory with Rev. Msgr. Blanchet as its first Vicar Apostolic. A Vicar Apostolic is a bishop in a territory which has not yet been organized as a diocese. The following year, Rev. Pierre-Jean DeSmet, S.J., and fellow priests and Sisters of Notre Dame de Namur arrived in Astoria from Belgium.

On 24 July 1846, the vicariate was transformed into a province comprising the Archdiocese of Oregon City and the Dioceses of Walla Walla and Vancouver's Island. That year St. Paul Church was erected.

Rapid growth in the Pacific Northwest led to the loss of territory of the Archdiocese of Oregon City from which the Vatican created the Vicariate Apostolic of Idaho and Montana on March 3, 1868. In 1870, Catholic Sentinel was founded as the official newspaper of the archdiocese.

St. Boniface Church was erected in Sublimity, Oregon in 1889.

20th century

Further territory was lost when the Diocese of Baker City was created on June 19, 1903.  St. Mary's Church in Mount Angel was erected in 1912.

Following the death of Archbishop Alexander Christie, Edward Daniel Howard was appointed the fifth Archbishop of Oregon City on April 30, 1926. His installation took place at St. Mary's Cathedral in Portland on August 26 of that year. On September 26, 1928, the name of the archdiocese was changed from Oregon City to Portland in Oregon, "in Oregon" being added because there was another diocese called Portland (in Maine). During his tenure as archbishop, Howard created a chancery in the cathedral rectory, later transferring it to a separate building. He reorganized the St. Vincent de Paul and Holy Name Societies, fostered the growth of Catholic Charities, and removed the Catholic Sentinel from private ownership.

In 1931, Howard led a successful campaign to repeal local zoning ordinances that prohibited the building of churches and parochial schools. He convened the Fourth Provincial Council of the archdiocese in 1932, and held a synod for the clergy in 1935. In 1939, he founded Central Catholic High School in Portland and was named an Assistant at the Pontifical Throne by Pope Pius XII in 1939. He convened the Fifth Provincial Council of the archdiocese in 1957, and attended all four sessions of the Second Vatican Council between 1962 and 1965.

21st century

Bankruptcy 
The Archdiocese's sexual abuse scandal prompted the archbishop to file for Chapter 11 reorganization on July 6, 2004. Portland became the first Catholic diocese to file for bankruptcy. Archbishop Vlazny described his actions by saying, "This is not an effort to avoid responsibility. It is, in fact, the only way I can assure that other claimants can be offered fair compensation." In February 2009, the Oregon Jesuit Province also filed for bankruptcy as well.

Clergy sexual abuse settlements
In April 2007, the archdiocese announced a settlement had been reached and the bankruptcy court had approved a financial plan of reorganization.$71.45 million was paid to 169 victims, averaging $342,000 each; this is the 8th largest Roman Catholic clergy sexual abuse settlements in the history of the U.S.  Diocesan bankruptcy filings list 11 priests as perpetrators.

In March 2011, the Oregon Jesuit Province agreed to pay $166.1 million in damages to nearly 500 sex abuse victims.

On January 29, 2013, Bishop Alexander Sample was appointed by Pope Benedict XVI to be the new Archbishop of Portland, succeeding John George Vlazny, whose resignation was accepted at the same time.

On August 6, 2016, World Spark, a retirement home provider run by Portland priest Michael Maslowsky, was forced to surrender documents showing that there had been numerous complaints of sex abuse against vulnerable residents at World Spark's St. Anthony Village elderly home, including some with dementia, between 2009 and 2016. By order, the documents were given to a plaintiff from a lawsuit which began in 2014. On October 1, 2018, it was revealed that Pope Francis had defrocked Maslowsky on June 4, 2018.

In 2018, Portland Archbishop Alexander King Sample acknowledged the history of sex abuse in the Archdiocese of Portland, which he described as an "institutional and spiritual" failure, and issued an apology. At the same time, it was reported that more than 100 sex abuse lawsuits were settled prior to the 2004 bankruptcy. More settlements were later issued in August 2019 when the Archdiocese of Portland agreed to pay nearly $4 million to eight men who claimed they were sexually abused by Rev. Pius Brazaukus in the 1970s and the 1980s.

Bishops

Apostolic Vicar of Oregon Country
 Francis Norbert Blanchet, appointed Bishop of Oregon City

Bishop of Oregon City
 François Norbert Blanchet (1846-1850), elevated to Archbishop

Archbishops of Oregon City
 François Norbert Blanchet (1850-1880)
 Charles John Seghers (1880-1884)
 William Hickley Gross, C.Ss.R. (1885-1898)
 Alexander Christie (1899-1925)
 Edward D. Howard (1926-1928), title changed with title of archdiocese

Archbishops of Portland in Oregon
 Edward D. Howard (1928-1966)
 Robert Dwyer (1966-1974)
 Cornelius M. Power (1974-1986)
 William J. Levada (1986-1995), appointed Archbishop of San Francisco and later Prefect of the Congregation for the Doctrine of the Faith (elevated to Cardinal in 2006)
 Francis George, OMI (1996-1997), appointed Archbishop of Chicago (Cardinal in 1998)
 John G. Vlazny (1997-2013)
 Alexander K. Sample (2013–present)

Current auxiliary bishop
Peter Leslie Smith (2014–present)

Former auxiliary bishops
Paul Edward Waldschmidt, CSC (1977-1990)
Kenneth Steiner (1977-2011)

Other priests of this diocese who became bishops
 Edward John O'Dea, appointed Bishop of Nesqually in 1896
 Charles Joseph O'Reilly, appointed Bishop of Baker City in 1903 and later Bishop of Lincoln
 Edwin Vincent O'Hara, appointed Bishop of Great Falls in 1930
 Francis Peter Leipzig, appointed Bishop of Baker City in 1950
 Liam S. Cary, appointed Bishop of Baker in 2012

High schools
 Blanchet Catholic School, Salem
 Central Catholic High School, Portland
 De La Salle North Catholic High School, Portland
 Jesuit High School, Portland
 La Salle High School, Milwaukie
 Marist Catholic High School, Eugene
 Regis High School, Stayton
 St. Mary's Academy, Portland
 St. Mary's High School, Medford
 Valley Catholic School, Beaverton

See also

 Catholic Church by country
 Catholic Church in the United States
 Ecclesiastical Province of Portland in Oregon
 Global organisation of the Catholic Church
 List of Roman Catholic archdioceses (by country and continent)
 List of Roman Catholic dioceses (alphabetical) (including archdioceses)
 List of Roman Catholic dioceses (structured view) (including archdioceses)
 List of Roman Catholic religious communities in Oregon
 List of the Catholic dioceses of the United States

References

External links
 Roman Catholic Archdiocese of Portland Official Site
 bankruptcy proceedings
 Catholic Sentinel - official newspaper 
 Committee of Parishioners in Western Oregon , formed to participate in the Archdiocese's bankruptcy case
 October 2005 update  on the status of Chapter 11 reorganization

 
Archdiocese of Portland
 
Archdiocese of Portland in Oregon
Christian organizations established in 1928
1928 establishments in Oregon
Portland
Portland Oregon
Christianity in Portland, Oregon
Companies that filed for Chapter 11 bankruptcy in 2004